Labastide-Monréjeau is a commune in the Pyrénées-Atlantiques department in the Nouvelle-Aquitaine region in Southwestern France. In 2019, it had a population of 604.

See also
Communes of the Pyrénées-Atlantiques department

References

Communes of Pyrénées-Atlantiques